"Society's Child" (originally titled "Baby I've Been Thinking") is a song written and recorded by American singer-songwriter Janis Ian in 1965.

Background
Its lyrics concern an interracial romance – a still-taboo subject in mid-1960s America. Ian was 13 years of age when she was motivated to write and compose the song, and she completed it when she was 14. Released as "Society's Child (Baby I've Been Thinking)", the single charted high in many cities in the autumn of 1966 but did not hit big nationally until the summer of 1967.

The lyrics of the song center on the feelings of a young girl who witnesses the humiliation that her African American boyfriend receives from the girl's mother and the taunts that she herself endures from classmates and teachers. It closes with her decision to end her relationship with the boyfriend because of her inability to deal with the social pressure.

In 1964, Ian lived in East Orange, New Jersey. Her neighborhood was predominantly populated by African Americans and she was one of very few whites in her school. I saw it from both ends. I was seeing it from the end of all the civil rights stuff on the television and radio, of white parents being incensed when their daughters would date black men, and I saw it around me when black parents were worried about their sons or daughters dating white girls or boys. I don't think I knew where I was going when I started it, but when I hit the second line, "face is clean and shining black as night", it was obvious where the song was going. I don't think I made a conscious decision to have the girl cop out in the end, it just seemed like that would be the logical thing at my age, because how can you buck school and society and your parents, and make yourself an outcast forever?

Songwriter and producer Shadow Morton signed Janis to a record contract and made the decision to issue "Society's Child" as her first release. Ian's original title for the song was "Baby, I've Been Thinking", but Morton changed it to "Society's Child". It was recorded using six studio musicians.

Leonard Bernstein's producer saw Janis perform "Society's Child" at The Gaslight and scheduled Ian to perform the song on Inside Pop: The Rock Revolution, an April 25, 1967 CBS television special about new pop music.  Largely owing to Bernstein's efforts, Verve Records started promoting it in trade magazines and many radio stations picked it up. But some radio stations, such as Chicago's WLS, refused to play the song. Though several radio stations were slow to add the song to their playlists, this behavior extended the record's airplay life.  
"Society's Child" was inducted into the Grammy Hall of Fame in 2001.

Chart performance
Recorded in 1965 and released in 1966, the single charted high in many cities in the autumn of 1966 but did not enter Billboard's Hot 100 until the spring of 1967 (the issue dated 27 May). The record reached number one or the Top Ten in several key cities across America, but in July it stalled at No. 14 on the Hot 100 owing to resistance in certain markets, as was the fate of several other controversial pop hits of the era. With the skin colors reversed for each gender, the Stories' version of "Brother Louie" topped the Hot 100 six years later, in 1973.

Chart history

Cover versions
Artists who covered “Society’s Child” include: 
Spooky Tooth on their 1968 album It's All About
Judy Stone & Third Eye in 1969 
Jeanette in 1973
Camel
Lou Gramm

On October 23, 2011, Ian performed the song with Ryan Adams and Neil Finn on BBC Four's Series 2 Episode 4 of the series, Songwriters' Circle. She stated that she conceived the song when she was 12, wrote it at 13, published it at 14, became known at 15, and was a has-been at 16.  The song was released in the midst of the Civil Rights Movement of the 1960s in the United States.  Ian went on to say that a radio station in the 1960s was burned to the ground for playing it and a writer at the Boston Herald was fired for writing about it.

References

1965 songs
1966 debut singles
1967 singles
Songs against racism and xenophobia
Janis Ian songs
Songs written by Janis Ian
Verve Records singles
Fiction about interracial romance